The High Sheriff of Berkshire, in common with other counties, was originally the King's representative on taxation upholding the law in Saxon times. The word Sheriff evolved from 'shire-reeve'.

The title of High Sheriff is therefore much older than the other crown appointment, the Lord Lieutenant of Berkshire, which came about after 1545. Between 1248 and 1566, Berkshire and Oxfordshire formed a joint shrievalty (apart from a brief period in 1258/1259). See High Sheriff of Oxfordshire.

Unlike the Lord Lieutenant of Berkshire, which is generally held from appointment until the holder's death or incapacity, the title of High Sheriff is appointed / reappointed annually. The High Sheriff is assisted by an Under-Sheriff of Berkshire.

List of High Sheriffs of Berkshire

1248–1566
See High Sheriff of Berkshire and Oxfordshire for incumbents during this period. (From 3 November 1258 to Michaelmas 1259, Nicholas de Hendred was sheriff for Berkshire only.)

1350
'''John de Alveton, Sheriff of Berks.''', replies that he has delivered to William de Emeldon, clerk, all the chattels of Geoffrey de Weston and half his lands, as in the extent drawn up in Geoffrey's absence.

1567–1599

1600–1699

1700–1799

1800–1899

1900–1999

2000–present

References

External links
Berkshire: the Royal County at Berkshire Record Office website.
Berkshire History: High Sheriffs of Berkshire

Bibliography
 (with amendments of 1963, Public Record Office)

 
Berkshire
Local government in Berkshire
High Sheriffs of Berkshire
High sheriffs of Oxfordshire